HRC Group is a large Bangladeshi industrial conglomerates. The industries under this conglomerate include media, agriproducts, tea, real estate, finance, shipping etc. The Chairperson of the group is Sayeed Hossain Chowdhury, brother of Saber Hossain Chowdhury, an Awami League member of parliament and son of entrepreneur Hedayet Hossain Chowdhury, founder of Karnaphuli Group, another Bangladeshi conglomerate.

History 
The group established on 14 March 1991 as Shipping Agency for Chittagong and Mongla ports by entrepreneur Sayeed Hossain Chowdhury. Since then it has expanded to more than 20 subsidiaries.

On 10 December 1998, two security guards of the group were killed during the robbery at the HRC Group headquarters in Karwan Bazar, Dhaka.

In July 2008, the chairperson of the group,  Sayeed Hossain Chowdhury, was arrested by joint forces on charges of money laundering and tax evasion. He received bail on 28 August 2008.

The Sponsor director of HRC Group, Farzana Chowdhury, was elected vice-chairperson in June 2009.

In July 2020, Chairperson of the HRC Group Sayeed Hossain Chowdhury was removed from the post of Chairperson of One Bank Limited by Bangladesh Bank due to subsidiaries of HRC Group defaulting on loans from various banks.

List of companies
Shipping and Logistics
 HRC Shipping Limited
 HRC Freight Limited
 HRC Travels Limited
 Travel Wise Limited
 Arkan Express Limited

Media
 Jaijaidin - Daily Bengali newspaper
 Protichitra - Weekly Bengali newspaper
 New Age- English daily newspaper
 Holiday Weekly English newspaper

Real Estate
 HRC Properties Ltd.
 Hamid Properties Limited

Agro-products
 HRC Dairies Limited
 HRC Agrocom
 HRC Land Limited (Clevedon Tea Estate and Dildarpur Tea Estate)
 HRC Products Limited producing Clevedon, Clone, and Premier branded tea.

Manufacturing
 HRC Lighting Limited
 HRC Lamps Limited

 IT 
 Information Services Network Limited which was the first Bangladeshi Private ISP as Bangla.net

 Finance 
 One Bank Limited
 Lanka Bangla Finance Limited
 Bangladesh General Insurance Company Limited
 National Housing Finance and Housing Limited

See also
 List of companies of Bangladesh

References

External links
 Group information

Conglomerate companies of Bangladesh
Companies based in Dhaka
1991 establishments in Bangladesh